Kunz, Künz, or Kunze is a surname. Notable people with the surname include:

Kunz (singer) (Marco Kunz, born 1985), Swiss singer
Adrian Kunz (born 1967), Swiss international footballer
Alfred Kunz (Catholic priest) (1931–1998), American murdered Catholic priest
Alfred Kunz (composer) (1929–2019), Canadian composer and conductor 
Andreas Kunz (1946-2022), German skier
Andreas Kunze (1952-2010), German actor
Anita Kunz (born 1956), Canadian artist and illustrator
Charlie Kunz (1896–1958), American pianist
Dana Kunze, American high diver
Drew Kunz (born 1969), American poet and artist
Earl Kunz (1898–1963), American professional baseball pitcher
Eddie Kunz (born 1986), American professional baseball pitcher
Eric Kunze (born 1971), American Broadway actor and singer
Erich Kunz (1909–1995), Austrian operatic baritone
Ernst Künz (1912–1944), Austrian football (soccer) player
Florian Kunz (born 1972), German field hockey player
George Kunz (born 1947), American football player
George Frederick Kunz (1856–1932), American mineralogist
Gustav Kunze (1793–1851), German zoologist, botanist and entomologist
Hansjörg Kunze (born 1959), German track and field athlete
Heinz Rudolf Kunze (born 1956), German writer and rock singer
Helmut Kunz, (1910–1976), Nazi doctor
John Christopher Kunze (1744–1807), German-American Lutheran pietist theologian
Johannes Kunze (1903–1943), German World War II prisoner of war
Kahena Kunze (born 1991), Brazilian sailor, 2 times olympic gold medalist (2016 - Rio, 2020 - Tokyo)
Kerstin Kunze (born 1971), German chess master
Michael Kunze (born 1943), German lyricist, book writer and librettist
Reiner Kunze (born 1933), German writer and GDR dissident
Richard Kunze (1872-1945), German politician
Rudibert Kunz (born 1943), German investigator, journalist and television editor
Rudolf Kunz, German motorcycle road racer
Terry Kunz (born 1952), American football player
Stanley H. Kunz (1864–1946), American politician from Illinois
Stephanie Kunze (born 1970), American politician from Ohio
Urs Kunz (born 1974), Swiss skier

See also
Kuntze, a surname
Cuntz, a surname
Kuntz (disambiguation)
Kunze, California, former name of Greenwater, California
Kunz v. New York, United States Supreme Court case concerning free speech
6847 Kunz-Hallstein, main belt asteroid
Koontz (surname)

Surnames
Surnames of German origin
German-language surnames
Surnames from given names